René Battaglia (born 27 November 1939) is a former weightlifter who represented Monaco at the 1964 Summer Olympic Games. Battaglia lifted a total of 407.5kg and finished sixteenth in the Men's 82.5 kg event of the 1964 Summer Olympic Games.

Personal life 
His cousin Philippe and uncle Gérard both represented Monaco at the Olympic Games in sailing.

References 

1939 births
Living people
Olympic weightlifters of Monaco
Monegasque male weightlifters
Weightlifters at the 1964 Summer Olympics